The Paria brushfinch (Arremon phygas) is a species of bird in the family Passerellidae.

Taxonomy

The Paria brushfinch was often treated as a subspecies of the stripe-headed brushfinch (A. torquatus), but was determined a distinct species, on the basis of differences in vocalization, plumage, and genetics.  The SACC split the group in 2010.

References

 

Paria brushfinch
Birds of the Venezuelan Coastal Range
Endemic birds of Venezuela
Paria brushfinch
Paria brushfinch